Live is a live album  by the Crossover Thrash, hardcore punk band, Dirty Rotten Imbeciles, recorded at the Hollywood Palladium in November 1994.

Track listing
 Intro + Thrashard 5:02
 Acid Rain 4:22
 Mad Man 0:51
 Couch Slouch 1:38
 Argument Then War 3:25
 The Application 4:21
 I Don't Need Society 1:59
 Hardball 3:03
 Violent Pacification 2:54
 Beneath The Wheel 5:15
 The Explorer 1:53
 Commuter Man 0:58
 You Say I'm Scum 2:23
 The Five Year. Plan 4:44
 Suit And Tie Guy 3:29
 Nursinghome Blues 4:28

Personnel 
 Spike Cassidy – guitar, backing vocals
 John Menor – bass, backing vocals
 Rob Rampy – drums, backing vocals
 Kurt Brecht – lead vocals

1994 live albums
D.R.I. (band) albums